Gekko boehmei, also known commonly as Boehme's gecko or Böhme's gecko,  is a species of lizard in the family Gekkonidae. The species is endemic to Laos.

Etymology
The specific name, boehmei, is in honor of German herpetologist Wolfgang Böhme.

Geographic range
G. boehmei is found in central Laos, in Khammouane Province.

Habitat

Description
G. boehmei is medium-sized for its genus.

References

Further reading
Luu VQ, Calame T, Nguyen TQ, Le MD, Ziegler T (2015). "Morphological and molecular review of the Gekko diversity of Laos with descriptions of three new species". Zootaxa 3986 (3): 279–306. (Gekko boehmei, new species).

Gekko
Reptiles described in 2015
Endemic fauna of Laos
Reptiles of Laos